Hopewell-Loudon High School is a public k-12 school in Bascom, Ohio.  It is the only high school in the Hopewell-Loudon Local Schools district.  Their mascot name is the Chieftains.

The school primarily serves residents of Hopewell Township and Loudon Township in Seneca County.  Bascom is located between Tiffin, Ohio and Fostoria, Ohio.  The current school building opened in 2013 and houses kindergarten through 12th grade.

Ohio Music Education Association State Appearance
In 2016, the Hopewell-Loudon Chieftain Concert Band, under direction of Mr. Jess Nelson, earned a "I" rating at the OMEA District 2 Competition at Oak Harbor middle school, allowing the band to go to OMEA State level competition for what is presumably the first time in school history. The band performed at Gahanna Lincoln High School in Columbus, and received a "II" rating at the state level.

Ohio High School Athletic Association State Championships

 Girls Volleyball – 1997, 1998, 1999, 2000, 2001
 Girls Basketball – 1999

External links
 District Website

Notes and references

High schools in Seneca County, Ohio
Public high schools in Ohio
Public middle schools in Ohio
Public elementary schools in Ohio